The L. C. Ranch Headquarters, in Gila, New Mexico, was built mostly in 1890 and was listed on the National Register of Historic Places in 1978.

The Lyons and Campbell Ranch Headquarters is located in the tiny village of Gila, by the Gila River, on New Mexico State Road 211, about a mile east of its intersection with U.S. Route 180.  Tom Lyons & Angus Campbell carved a cattle empire out of mountain, plains and desert to create the second largest cattle operation in the U.S. 
At its peak around 1900 the L.C. Ranch controlled over one million acres, carried a herd of 60,000 head, and shipped up to 30,000 head of cattle to market per year. It employed up to 75 cowboys working seven chuckwagon teams on the open range and 100 Mexican families working the irrigated farmland along the Gila. The lavishly furnished house and hunting lodge up river were designed to entertain investors from the East coast.   
It is an E-shaped adobe building, created from expanding what is believed to be a U-shaped old Spanish Rancho Del Paz estancia built in 1811 by two detachments of Spanish troops to feed the miners at Santa Rita del Cobre, at that time the only copper mine in North America.  The expansion added 15 rooms to the main house, a 6 room bunkhouse, a store with saloon, Catholic church, post office, jail, barns and warehouse, and used adobe bricks that are believed to have been taken from the nearby, abandoned Fort West.  It included a trapdoor under the bed in Tom Lyons' bedroom, supposed to provide a safe place for him.  He was threatened by struggles over open range, water rights, and sod-busters, and in fact was ultimately murdered, bludgeoned with a hammer and iron bar by hired assassin Felix Jones and two accomplices in 1917 in El Paso, Texas, chronicled by Jerry Lobdill in "The Last Train to El Paso".

Today the L.C. Ranch Headquarters is owned and operated by the Ocheltree Foundation Inc, a 501(c)3 since 1984. The Ocheltree family acquired the L.C. Ranch Headquarters in 1961, and has lovingly cared for the ranch ever since. Tours are available Saturdays at noon by reservation. Two Airbnb apartments in the historic adobe bunkhouse are available for short term vacation rental and there are also 3 RV sites for overnight visitors. www.LyonsCampbellRanch.com

References

External links

Ranches in New Mexico
National Register of Historic Places in Grant County, New Mexico
Buildings and structures completed in 1890